Patrice Lecornu (born 28 March 1958 in Flers, Orne) is a French former professional footballer who played as a  striker.

References

External links
 
 

1958 births
Living people
Sportspeople from Orne
French footballers
France international footballers
Association football forwards
Red Star F.C. players
Angers SCO players
FC Nantes players
Ligue 1 players
Ligue 2 players
French football managers
Red Star F.C. managers
France youth international footballers
Footballers from Normandy